Wanniarachchige Martinus Bibile Fonseka (19 November 1912 - ??) was a Ceylonese politician. He was elected from the Bulathsinhala electorate from the United National Party to the House of Representatives defeating Mangala Moonesinghe in the 1960 March general elections.

References

1912 births

Members of the 4th Parliament of Ceylon
Sinhalese politicians
United National Party politicians
Year of death missing